This is a list of compositions by Donald Tovey.

Piano

Piano solo
Bagatelles
Allegro and Andante
Variations on an Original Theme
Passacaglia

Two pianos
Balliol Dances

Instrument solo
Sonata eroica for Violin solo, Op. 29
Sonata for Cello solo, Op. 30

Chamber music

Violin and piano
Violin Sonata

Cello and piano
Cello Sonata in F major, Op. 4
Elegiac Variations for Cello and Piano, Op. 25 (written in tribute to Robert Hausmann)

Piano trio
Piano Trio in B minor, Op. 1
Piano Trio in D major, Op. 27
Piano Trio in C minor, Op. 8, "Style tragique"

Piano quartet
Piano Quartet in E minor, Op. 12

Piano quintet
Piano Quintet in C major, Op. 6

String quartet
Aria and Variations for String Quartet, Op. 11
String Quartet in G major, Op. 23
String Quartet in D major, Op. 24

Other
Trio for Clarinet, Horn and Piano, Op. 8
Trio for Violin, English Horn and Piano, Op. 14
Clarinet Sonata in B flat, Op. 16
Variations on a theme by Gluck for Flute and String Quartet, Op. 28
Divertimento for Oboe and Piano
Sonata for 2 Cellos

Orchestral

Symphonies 
Symphony in D, Op. 32

Piano and orchestra
Piano Concerto in A major, Op. 15

Cello and orchestra
Cello Concerto in C major, Op. 40

Other
Air for String Orchestra
National March for the Sultan of Zanzibar for Orchestra

Opera
The Bride of Dionysus.

Choral music
25 Rounds, Op. 5
Anthems for unaccompanied choir
Agnus Dei
A Lyke Wake Dirge
The Mad Maid's Song
On May Morning
The Lord is my Shepherd

Songs
Songs for Bass, Op. 2

References

External links
List of compositions (in German)
List of compositions

Tovey, Donald